Iso-Pyhäntä is a medium-sized lake in northern Finland, 15 km southeast of Ristijärvi settlement.  It belongs to the Oulujoki main catchment area. It is located in the Kainuu region.

See also
List of lakes in Finland

References

Kainuu
Lakes of Ristijärvi